The Tennessee Department of Finance and Administration (TDFA) is a state agency of Tennessee. Its headquarters are in the Tennessee Tower in Nashville. Stuart McWhorter has been the Commissioner since 2019.

Commissioners 
On June 1, 2013, Larry Martin became the interim Commissioner of the Department. On August 13, 2013, Martin became the new official Commissioner. On November 27, 2018, Governor-elect Bill Lee announced that Stuart McWhorter would become the next Commissioner of Finance and Administration. McWhorter was sworn in on January 19, 2019.

References

External links

 Tennessee Department of Finance and Administration

State agencies of Tennessee